Chukwuka Charles Ofoyen (born 26 July 1985) is a Nigerian footballer who currently plays as a defender for KF Laçi in the Albanian Superliga.

References

1985 births
Living people
Nigerian footballers
Kategoria Superiore players
Nigerian expatriate footballers
Nigerian expatriate sportspeople in Albania
Expatriate footballers in Albania
Association football defenders
KF Laçi players